The teams competing in Group 8 of the 2013 UEFA European Under-21 Championship qualifying competition were Azerbaijan, Belgium, England, Iceland, and Norway.

Standings

Results and fixtures

Goalscorers
4 goals

 Craig Dawson
 Henri Lansbury
 Alex Oxlade-Chamberlain

3 goals

 Javid Imamverdiyev
 Michy Batshuayi
 Björn Bergmann Sigurðarson

2 goals

 Christian Benteke
 Gianni Bruno
 Igor Vetokele
 Steven Caulker
 Gary Gardner
 Jordan Henderson
 Martin Kelly
 Marcus Pedersen

1 goal

 Araz Abdullayev
 Ali Gökdemir
 Cihan Özkara
 Ziguy Badibanga
 Jimmy de Jonghe
 Nill De Pauw
 Omar El Kaddouri
 Gregory Mertens
 Thomas Meunier
 Jens Naessens
 Wannes Van Tricht
 Jonjo Shelvey
 Marvin Sordell
 Martyn Waghorn
 Connor Wickham
 Rúnar Már Sigurjónsson
 Mushaga Bakenga
 Jo Inge Berget
 Valon Berisha
 Torgeir Børven
 Magnus Eikrem
 Markus Henriksen
 Yann-Erik de Lanlay
 Joshua King
 Thomas Rogne
 Harmeet Singh
 Joakim Våge Nilsen

References

External links
Standings and fixtures at UEFA.com

Group 8